The women's 50m backstroke S2 event at the 2012 Summer Paralympics took place at the  London Aquatics Centre on 5 September. There were two heats; the swimmers with the eight fastest times advanced to the final.

Results

Final
Competed at 20:01.

 
'Q = qualified for final. WR = World Record. EU = European Record. AF = African Record.

References
Official London 2012 Paralympics Results: Heats
Official London 2012 Paralympics Results: Final 

Swimming at the 2012 Summer Paralympics
2012 in women's swimming